William Francis Hare, 5th Earl of Listowel,  (28 September 1906 – 12 March 1997), styled Viscount Ennismore between 1924 and 1931, was an Anglo-Irish peer and Labour politician. He was the last Secretary of State for India as well as the last Governor-General of Ghana.

Background and education
Lord Listowel was the eldest son of Richard Hare, 4th Earl of Listowel, and Freda, daughter of Francis Vanden-Bempde-Johnstone, 2nd Baron Derwent. John Hare, 1st Viscount Blakenham, a Conservative Cabinet minister, was his younger brother. He was educated at Eton College, Balliol College, Oxford, Magdalene College, Cambridge and King's College London (PhD, 1932).

Political career
Listowel served as a lieutenant in the Intelligence Corps. He entered the House of Lords on the death of his father in November 1931, by right of the United Kingdom peerage of Baron Hare, and made his maiden speech in March of the following year. He was a Labour Party whip in the Lords from 1941 to 1944 and Deputy Leader of the House of Lords and Under-Secretary of State for India and Burma from 1944 to 1945. 

When Labour came to power in 1945 under Clement Attlee, Listowel was appointed Postmaster General, a post he held until April 1947, and was briefly Minister of Information between February and March 1946, when the office was abolished.

In April 1947 he entered the cabinet as Secretary of State for India and Burma. Prime Minister Clement Attlee, however, made all the government's major decisions regarding India. After India gained independence in August 1947, his cabinet title became Secretary of State for Burma, working from the Burma Office, but in January 1948 this too was abolished, when Burma also gained independence, and Listowel then left the cabinet. He continued to serve under Attlee as Minister of State for Colonial Affairs from 1948 to 1950 and as Joint Parliamentary Secretary to the Ministry of Agriculture and Fisheries from 1950 to 1951. In 1957 he was appointed Governor-General of Ghana, a post he held until 1960, when Ghana became a Republic. He was later Chairman of Committees in the House of Lords between 1965 and 1976. He remained an active member of the House of Lords, speaking for the last time in July 1995, aged 88.

Apart from his career in national politics, Lord Listowel was a member of the London County Council for East Lewisham between 1937 and 1946, and for Battersea North between 1952 and 1957. He was appointed a Privy Counsellor in 1946 and a GCMG in 1957.

Family
Lord Listowel married three times:
 
 firstly, to Judith, daughter of Raoul de Marffy-Mantuana, in 1933. They had one daughter, Deirdre, who married firstly John Norton, 7th Baron Grantley and then after his death Ian Curteis; Lord and Lady Listowel were divorced in 1945. 
 secondly, to Stephanie Sandra Yvonne, daughter of Sam Wise, in 1958. They had one daughter; they were divorced in 1963. 
 thirdly, to Pamela (née Day) in 1963. They had two sons and one daughter. Pamela, Countess Listowel, lives in Hampstead.

Death
Lord Listowel died in March 1997, aged 90, and was succeeded by his elder son from his third marriage, Francis.

References

External links
 
Earl of Listowel's Memoirs; redrice.com. Retrieved 13 September 2014.
 

1906 births
1997 deaths
20th-century Anglo-Irish people
Alumni of Balliol College, Oxford
Alumni of King's College London
Alumni of Magdalene College, Cambridge
5
Foreign Office personnel of World War II
Governors-General of Ghana
William
Intelligence Corps officers
Knights Grand Cross of the Order of St Michael and St George
Labour Party (UK) councillors
Labour Party (UK) hereditary peers
Members of London County Council
Members of the Privy Council of the United Kingdom
Ministers in the Attlee governments, 1945–1951
Ministers in the Churchill wartime government, 1940–1945
Place of birth missing
Place of death missing
United Kingdom Postmasters General
People educated at Eton College